Elections to Maidstone Borough Council were held on 5 May 2011. One-third of the borough council (20 members) were up for election. Parish council elections and the national Alternative Vote referendum were held on the same day.

Overall results
The Conservatives stayed in overall control of the council by gaining two seats. The Liberal Democrats lost two seats.

Ward results

References & notes

2011 English local elections
2011
2010s in Kent